Evelyn Ellis may refer to:

 Evelyn Ellis, African American character actress
 Hon Evelyn Ellis, British motoring pioneer
Evelyn Ellis (Big Brother)